Eldegard is a surname. Notable people with the surname include:

Arne Konrad Eldegard (1917–2018), Norwegian banker and politician
Gunvor Eldegard (born 1963), Norwegian politician
Sigurd Eldegard (1866–1950), Norwegian actor, playwright, and theatre director

Norwegian-language surnames